"Nobody Speak" is a song by American hip hop producer DJ Shadow, featuring rap verses from American rap duo Run the Jewels. The song was first a part of Run the Jewels' Record Store Day release, which was a virtual reality cardboard viewer that included a digital download code for the song. It also acted as the lead single from Shadow's fifth studio album, The Mountain Will Fall (2016). A music video for the song was released on August 24, 2016.

Composition
"Nobody Speak" features rap verses from El-P and Killer Mike of rap duo Run the Jewels, who were credited as the song's writers alongside DJ Shadow. It contains a musical sample of "Ol' Man River" by Caterina Valente, and a lyrical sample from "Top Billin'" (from Audio Two's 1987 album What More Can I Say?).

The instrumental features a funk-like bass and drum groove, brass horns, as well as guitar loops. Shadow chose El-P and Killer Mike as collaborators due to their vocal style fitting the song's instrumental the most.

Release
"Nobody Speak" was first made available through the Run the Jewels Record Store Day release. It consisted of a special virtual reality cardboard viewer, which held a code that granted the purchaser to a free digital download of the song. The song was eventually made available for a paid download through Mass Appeal Records. The song was later released as a limited edition 12" vinyl single on August 24, 2016 through Mass Appeal and Liquid Amber.

Music video
A music video for "Nobody Speak" was released on August 24, 2016. The video, which has been described as "brutal [and] politically charged", features political representatives in a meeting. The leaders of the groups begin a rap battle against each other, which after around 90 seconds turns into an all-out brawl involving virtually everyone in the meeting room. The video finishes with one leader preparing to impale his counterpart with an American flag.

The leaders of the groups are played by Igor Tsyshkevych and Ian Bailey. Shadow commented on the video, saying that they wanted to make a "positive, life-affirming video that captures politicians at their election-year best. We got this instead." Killer Mike also commented on the video, saying that "It's such a dope video ... it's what I really wish Trump and Hillary would just do and get it over with."

The video was directed by Sam Pilling and features cameo appearances of Shadow, El-P, and Killer Mike.  It was filmed at the "Ukrainian Dim" (Ukrainian House) exhibition center in Kyiv, Ukraine.

Use in media

The song has appeared in trailers for films including Suburbicon, Booksmart, and Good Boys.

A television ad campaign in 2021 for the electric Cadillac Lyriq automobile featured the instrumental portion of the song.

Track listing
Mass Appeal — MSAP0034 — Promotional CD-R and digital download single

Mass Appeal / Liquid Amber — MSAP0036LP — 12" vinyl single

Personnel
Personnel adapted from The Mountain Will Fall liner notes.

Tim Burns – trombone
DJ Shadow – arrangement, composing, mixing, production, programming
El-P – composing, vocals
Mikael Eldridge – mixing
Killer Mike – composing, vocals
Graham Pike – trumpet
Jake Telford – baritone and tenor saxophone

Charts

Certifications

References

2016 singles
2016 songs
DJ Shadow songs
Songs written by El-P
Songs written by Killer Mike
Songs written by DJ Shadow